Patania balteata is a moth of the family Crambidae. It was described by Johan Christian Fabricius in 1798. It is found across southern Europe, Africa and Asia, including Japan, Korea, Réunion, Madagascar, Taiwan, Thailand, Turkey and Ukraine, as well as New South Wales and Queensland in Australia. There is also an old record from Hawaii.

Adults are pale brown with several faint dark zigzag lines across each wing.

The larvae feed on Anacardium occidentale, Quercus serrata and Castanea species.

References

Japanese Moths
Fauna Europaea

External links

Moths described in 1798
Moths of Africa
Moths of Europe
Moths of Asia
Moths of Australia
Spilomelinae
Taxa named by Johan Christian Fabricius